The  British Rail Class 70 is a Co-Co mainline freight GE PowerHaul locomotive series manufactured by General Electric in Erie, Pennsylvania. They are operated in the United Kingdom by Freightliner and Colas Rail. These locomotives replaced the Class 59 as having the highest tractive effort of any Co-Co Diesel locomotive in use in the United Kingdom when they were introduced.

Background and specification

In November 2007, Freightliner announced Project Genesis, a procurement plan for 30 freight locomotives from General Electric (GE). The locomotives ordered were intended to match older types in terms of haulage capacity whilst at the same time being more fuel-efficient. The project was a collaborative effort between Freightliner and GE, with input from drivers on the cab design. The locomotive meets EU Tier IIIa emission regulations. Freightliner expects that the locomotive's efficiency is 7% better than contemporary models, with a further 3% increase in efficiency whilst braking; regenerative braking is used to supply the energy to power auxiliary motors.

The locomotives were given the Class 70 TOPS code.

The new locomotives are similar in appearance to a Class 58; a hood unit design with a narrow body typical of locomotive types in use in North America, the cabs are accessed from the rear via exterior walkways on the narrow part of the hood. The distinctive front end shape is due to crashworthiness features It is also fitted with air conditioning and acoustic insulation to improve the crew's environment, making it an improvement over the Class 66.

Operations

Freightliner

Construction of the first two locomotives at GE's Erie, Pennsylvania plant was completed in July 2009, with both locomotives tested during the same month. The original plan was for two months of testing, with the locomotives then spending a further three weeks being modified where necessary and prepared for transport to the United Kingdom.

The first two locomotives arrived at Newport Docks on 8 November 2009. The delivery gave GE its first locomotives in service on the British rail network. The first locomotive was given the name PowerHaul' at Leeds on 24 November 2009.

Four more locomotives were delivered to the UK on 2 December 2009. On operation tests, 70001 hauled a 30-wagon train consisting of 60ISO containers during December 2009. 70002 also hauled a 19 hopper  coal train in the same month.

On 5 January 2011, 70012 was severely damaged while being unloaded at Newport Dock when part of the lifting gear failed, causing the locomotive to fall back into the hold of the ship.

In January 2017, some were placed in store at Freightliner's Leeds Midland Road depot. By July 2018, 13 of the 19 were in store. In March 2020, only four remained in store, the rest having been returned to service. However, by June 2020 all Freightliner examples were in storage at Leeds Midlands Road, with only two, 016 and 017, returning to service as of July 2020.

Turkish demonstrator
In August 2012, it was announced that the demonstrator locomotive built in Turkey in 2011 was to be transferred to the UK and allocated the number 70099. The locomotive was to be allocated to the private owners pool for use as required. On 19 November 2012, it was announced that 70099 was to test trial with GB Railfreight for coal and intermodal traffic trials.

Colas Rail

In November 2013, Colas Rail announced it had ordered ten class 70s for entry into service in 2014; the order included the Turkish built demonstrator 70099, renumbered as 70801, and the remainder of Freightliner's original order option of 30 locomotives.

Colas' locomotives were allotted numbers in the 708xx range. Locomotives 70802–70805 had already been constructed at the time of the order and were shipped to the United Kingdom in January 2014, with the rest assembled and delivered later the same year. In 2015, Colas announced the purchase of an additional seven locomotives, which were delivered by 2017.

Accidents and incidents
The impact severely bent the locomotive's frame, rendering it unserviceable and resulting in it later being returned to the United States. It was rebuilt as a test bed and used as a shunter at the Erie plant.
On 30 October 2016, locomotive 70804 ran away and was derailed at Toton Sidings in Nottinghamshire.
The derailment was caused by a defect which allowed the track to spread underneath the train.

See also
 GE CM20EMP, Indonesian twin-cab GE locomotive

Notes

References

External links

70 (Powerhaul)
Co-Co locomotives
GE PowerHaul
Railway locomotives introduced in 2009
Standard gauge locomotives of Great Britain
Diesel-electric locomotives of Great Britain